The black-cheeked ant tanager (Habia atrimaxillaris) is a species of bird in the family Cardinalidae. It is endemic to Costa Rica.

Taxonomy and systematics

The original description of the black-cheeked ant tanager assigned it the binomial Phoenicothraupis atrimaxillaris and placed it in family Thraupidae, the "true" tanagers. Genus Habia was later shown to have priority so the species was renamed to its current binomial. In the early 2000s, DNA analysis revealed that all the members of Habia were more closely related to the cardinals, so they were moved to family Cardinalidae.

Description

The male's upper parts are dark gray with a red tinge, and it has a (usually invisible) orange-red crest. The face has a diffuse black "mask". The throat is bright salmon orange that transitions through darker salmon to dark gray with a pink tinge on the belly. The female is similar but duller and its crest is smaller.

Distribution and habitat

The black-cheeked ant tanager is found only on Costa Rica's Osa Peninsula and the adjoining eastern shore of Golfo Dulce. It inhabits well-developed understorey in lowland forest, riparian woodlands, and older secondary forest. It stays in the forest interior and shuns edges and open habitat.

Behavior

Feeding

The black-cheeked ant tanager is primarily insectivorous, though it also eats fruits and small vertebrates.

Breeding

The black-cheeked ant tanager has been documented nesting between January and March. It builds an open cup nest fairly low in understorey vegetation. All known clutches were of two eggs. The species appears to nest cooperatively, as three adults have been documented attending nestlings.

Vocalization

The black-cheeked ant tanager's dawn song has been variously described as "whistled phrases...chonk TWEEah, chonk TWEEah" and a "clear, mellow, whistled tu-see, tu-see or tu-seeur tu-swee tu-seeur" .

Status

The IUCN has assessed the black-cheeked ant tanager as near threatened "because of its small range which is mostly confined to two protected areas." "The primary threat to [the species] is ongoing fragmentation of lowland forest".

References

External links
 BirdLife International fact sheet for the species
 Amateur video of the Black-cheeked ant tanager

black-cheeked ant tanager
Endemic birds of Costa Rica
black-cheeked ant tanager
black-cheeked ant tanager
Taxonomy articles created by Polbot
Isthmian–Pacific moist forests